Eucalyptus intertexta, commonly known as inland red box, western red box, gum coolibah or the bastard coolibah, is a species of tree that is endemic to central Australia. It has rough, fibrous or flaky bark on the base of the trunk, smooth white to brownish bark above, lance-shaped adult leaves, flower buds in groups of seven on the ends of branchlets, white flowers and cup-shaped to hemispherical fruit.

Description
Eucalyptus intertexta is a tree, rarely a mallee that typically grows to a height  and forms a lignotuber. It has rough fibrous or flaky bark on the base of the trunk, sometimes on its full length, smooth white to grey or brownish bark above. Flowering occurs in most months and the flowers are white.

Taxonomy and naming
Eucalyptus intertexta was first formally described in 1900 by Richard Thomas Baker in Proceedings of the Linnean Society of New South Wales. The specific epithet (intertexta) is from Latin words meaning 'between' and 'tissue', referring to the inter-woven bark fibres.

Distribution and habitat
The inland red box grows in woodland and open woodland in the central deserts of Western Australia, the Northern Territory, and South Australia, extending into western parts of New South Wales, southern Queensland and eastern South Australia.

References

intertexta
Myrtales of Australia
Flora of New South Wales
Flora of Queensland
Flora of South Australia
Flora of the Northern Territory
Eucalypts of Western Australia
Plants described in 1900
Trees of Australia
Taxa named by Richard Thomas Baker